Ronald Leendert Brouwer (born 24 April 1979 in Hellevoetsluis, South Holland) is a field hockey striker from the Netherlands, who won the silver medal with the Dutch national team at the 2004 Summer Olympics in Athens. He is the cousin of Matthijs Brouwer. He played a total of 220 games for the Dutch national team in which he scored 80 goals.

Club career
He played for HGC and HC Bloemendaal in the Dutch highest division. Bloemendaal was his last club in the Dutch highest league where he played until 2014. After that he played one year for Dutch second division club Almere before he went to Belgium to play three years for Braxgata HC. In 2018 he lengthened his career again by signing for Dutch second division club HC Schaerweijde.

References

External links
 

1979 births
Living people
Dutch male field hockey players
Male field hockey forwards
2002 Men's Hockey World Cup players
Field hockey players at the 2004 Summer Olympics
2006 Men's Hockey World Cup players
Field hockey players at the 2008 Summer Olympics
2010 Men's Hockey World Cup players
Olympic field hockey players of the Netherlands
Olympic silver medalists for the Netherlands
People from Hellevoetsluis
Olympic medalists in field hockey
Medalists at the 2004 Summer Olympics
HGC players
HC Bloemendaal players
Men's Hoofdklasse Hockey players
Men's Belgian Hockey League players
Dutch expatriate sportspeople in Belgium
Expatriate field hockey players
Sportspeople from South Holland